Gwenn ha du means white and black in Breton. It is the name of:
 The Flag of Brittany
 A Breton nationalist terrorist organisation, see Gwenn ha du (terrorism)